was a Japanese domain of the Edo period.  It is associated with Hizen Province in modern-day Saga Prefecture.

In the han system, Ōmura was a political and economic abstraction based on periodic cadastral surveys and projected agricultural yields.  In other words, the domain was defined in terms of kokudaka, not land area. This was different from the feudalism of the West.

History
Ōmura was settled in ancient times, and was controlled by the Ōmura clan since the 12th century. The Ōmura clan claimed descent from Fujiwara no Sumitomo (d. 941). Ōmura Tadazumi, an 8th generation descendant from Fujiwara no Sumitomo, was the first to take the Ōmura name, from the location of his castle and estates. Among his descendants was Ōmura Sumitada (1532–1587), one of the Christian daimyō of Kyūshū. Sumitada opened the port of Nagasaki to the Portuguese and sponsored its development. Following Toyotomi Hideyoshi's campaign against the Shimazu clan, the Ōmura were confirmed in their holdings, though Nagasaki was taken from the Jesuits and made into a chokkatsu-ryō, or direct landholding, of the Toyotomi administration. His son, Ōmura Yoshiaki (1568–1615) sided with Tokugawa Ieyasu at the Battle of Sekigahara, but was forced to give up his domains to his son, Ōmura Sumiyori (d. 1619). Sumiyori had been baptized like his father and grandfather, but with the promulgation of the edicts banning Christianity, he became an apostate and persecuted the Christians in his domain. The Ōmura thus gained the trust of the Tokugawa shogunate, and were confirmed in their holdings of 27,900 koku until the Meiji Restoration.

The final daimyō, Ōmura Sumihiro, was initially a strong supporter of the Tokugawa government, and was entrusted with the position of Nagasaki bugyō in 1862. However, he defected to the Sonnō jōi side in 1864, and joined with the Satchō Alliance in the Boshin War. In 1871, with the abolition of the han system, Ōmura domain became part of the new Nagasaki Prefecture.

His son, Ōmura Sumio was elevated to the rank of viscount (shishaku) in the kazoku peerage system in 1884, and further elevated to count (hakushaku) in 1891. However, as he had no son, he adopted his son-in-law, the son of Shimazu Tadahiro to be his heir.

The former Ōmura domain is now part of Ōmura city, Nagasaki Prefecture.

List of daimyōs 
The hereditary daimyōs were head of the clan and head of the domain.

 Ōmura clan, 1600–1868 (tozama; 28,000 koku)

{| class=wikitable
!  ||Name || Tenure || Courtesy title || Court Rank
|-
||1||||1587–1616||Tangō-no-kami || Lower 5th (従五位下)
|-
||2||||1616–1619||Minbu-daisuke || Lower 5th (従五位下)
|-
||3||||1620–1651||Tangō-no-kami || Lower 5th (従五位下)
|-
||4||||1651–1706||Inaba-no-kami || Lower 5th (従五位下)
|-
||5||||1706–1712||Chikugo-no-kami || Lower 5th (従五位下)
|-
||6||||1712–1727||Ise-no-kami || Lower 5th (従五位下)
|-
||7||||1727–1748||Kawachi-no-kami || Lower 5th (従五位下)
|-
||8||||1748–1761||Danjō-shōhitsu || Lower 5th (従五位下)
|-
||9||||1761–1803||Shinano-no-kami　|| Lower 5th (従五位下)
|-
||10||||1803–1836||Tangō-no-kami　|| Lower 5th (従五位下)
|-
||11||||1835–1847||Tangō-no-kami　|| Lower 5th (従五位下)
|-
||12||||1847–1871||Tangō-no-kami　|| Lower 5th (従五位下)
|-
||XX||Ōmura Sumio || 大村純雄 ||
|-
|}

See also 
 List of Han
 Abolition of the han system

References

Domains of Japan
1871 disestablishments in Japan